Carolina is a municipality in the state of Maranhão in the Northeast region of Brazil.

Carolina is served by Brig. Lysias Augusto Rodrigues Airport.

See also
List of municipalities in Maranhão

References

External links

Municipalities in Maranhão